Frank William Kirkleski (May 19, 1904 – May 6, 1980) was a professional American football player from Nutley, New Jersey. He played during the early years of the National Football League (NFL) for the Pottsville Maroons, Orange Tornadoes, Newark Tornadoes and the Brooklyn Dodgers. Kirkleski played college football for Lafayette College, in which he graduated from in 1927.

College
While at Lafayette, Kirkleski was known as a hard-hitting back. He played all four of his college years as a varsity halfback. During his freshman season, he shocked Lafayette's archrival, Lehigh University, with a touchdown run that gave the Leopards a 13–3 last-minute victory in 1923. Lehigh only scored three points in Kirkleski's four years at Lafayette. In his sophomore year, he helped guide Lafayette to a 7–2 record. He was named the team's captain during his senior year. It was then that he helped the Leopards capture their third national championship with a 9–0 record. He received second and third-team All-American honors from the New York Telegraph and The New York World in 1926. He was later inducted into the school's Maroon Club Hall Of Fame in 2001.

Pottsville Maroons
After college Kirkleski played for the Pottsville Maroons of the National Football League. In his professional debut, Kirkleski threw two touchdown passes to lead the Maroons over the Buffalo Bisons 22–0. Then on October 16, 1927, he led his team down the field on three passes, where he recovered a fumble, by teammate Tony Latone, in the endzone to give the Maroons a last minute win over the Providence Steam Roller. Kirkleski would haunt Providence again in a rematch on November 24. In that game, he threw a 21-yard pass to Gus Kenneally to give Pottsville a 6–0 victory.

Orange Athletic Club
In 1928, Kirkleski joined the independent Orange Athletic Club from New Jersey. During a game against the NFL's Staten Island Stapletons, he threw for a touchdown and combined, with another quarterback, to throw for 143 yards on 23 passes without an interception, which was an accomplishment in 1928. However Kirkleski gave up a costly interception, in the team's finale against the Stapletons, which was returned for a Staten Island touchdown. That error resulted in a 6-0 Orange loss.

Orange–Newark Tornadoes
In 1929 he joined the Orange Tornadoes. That year Kirkleski had one rushing touchdown and one receiving touchdown. When the team was renamed the Newark Tornadoes in 1930, Kirkleski rushed for one touchdown.

Brooklyn Dodgers
Kirkleski's final year in professional football, in 1931, was spent with the Brooklyn Dodgers. He only played three games that season and did not register a score for that season.

References

1904 births
1980 deaths
American football halfbacks
Brooklyn Dodgers (NFL) players
Lafayette Leopards football players
Newark Tornadoes players
Orange Tornadoes players
Pottsville Maroons players
People from Nutley, New Jersey
Players of American football from New Jersey